Romanovo is a rural locality (a selo) in Kabansky District, Republic of Buryatia, Russia. The population was 131 as of 2010. There are 17 streets.

Geography 
Romanovo is located 39 km north of Kabansk (the district's administrative centre) by road. Khandala is the nearest rural locality.

References 

Rural localities in Kabansky District